Dinéault is a commune in the Finistère department and administrative region of Brittany in north-western France.

Population
In French the inhabitants of Dinéault are known as Dinéaultais.

Geography

The Menez Hom, a mountain that offers an exceptional panoramic view of the Finistère, is located in the commune.

Map

See also
Communes of the Finistère department
Parc naturel régional d'Armorique
Roland Doré sculptor

References

External links

Official website

Mayors of Finistère Association 

Communes of Finistère